Lazzaro Calamechi or Lazzaro Calamech (born 1530) was an Italian painter and sculptor.

He was born in Carrara. Along with his uncle Andrea, they sculpted the stucco statues for the catafalque or Castrum doloris erected for Michelangelo's elaborate funeral in Florence. No further works are known.

References

1530 births
Year of death unknown
People from Carrara
16th-century Italian sculptors
Italian male sculptors
16th-century Italian painters
Italian male painters